Naan Avalai Sandhitha Pothu ( When I met her) is a 2019 Tamil-language comedy film directed by L. G. Ravichander who earlier directed Masani and Aindhaam Thalaimurai Sidha Vaidhiya Sigamani (2014). The film features Santhosh Prathap and Chandini Tamilarasan in the leading roles. The film began production in early 2016 and was released on 27 Dec 2019.

Cast

 Santhosh Prathap as Moorthy
 Chandini Tamilarasan  as Rajakumari
 Innocent as producer
 Chaams as Moorthy's friend  
 G. M. Kumar as Kumari's father
 Sujatha Sivakumar as Kumari's mother
 A. Govindamoorthy as Assistant director
 Radha
 Shanthi Williams 
 Sriranjini 
 Shanmugasundaram
 Singamuthu as astrologer
 Halwa Vasu
 R. Sundarrajan as himself
 T. P. Gajendran as himself
 V. T. Rethishkumar

Production
The film is set in 1995-96 and is based on a real-life story, and was shot in places like Tenkasi, Courtallam, and Papanasam.

Soundtrack
Soundtrack was composed by Hitesh Murugavel.
Raavaa Naanum - Tippu (lyrics by L G Ravichandar)
Allikollava - Pawan, Saritha (lyrics by L G Ravichandar)
Poo Meedhu - Vijay Yesudas (lyrics by Na. Muthukumar)
Kannadi Kanavugale - Vijay Yesudas (lyrics by Arivumathi)

Reception
Times of India wrote "The story has necessary elements for a 90s family drama, but the fact that we are currently two decades ahead makes it difficult for one to connect with the happenings in it. [..] The lack of detailing and inclusion of some outdated scenes are the major reasons why the film fails to impress". Dinamalar gave the film a rating of two out of five. Deccan Chronicle wrote that "The only bright spot in the film is the portions involving ace Malayalam actor Innocent". Maalaimalar called the film "emotional".

References

2019 films
Indian drama films
2010s Tamil-language films
Indian films based on actual events
Films shot in Tirunelveli
Films set in 1995
2019 drama films